Prior to European settlement, the Caribbean was dominated by forested ecosystems.  The insular Caribbean has been considered a biodiversity hotspot. Although species diversity is lower than on mainland systems, endemism is high.

Species diversity is highest and endemism is lowest in Trinidad, which has a predominantly continental flora.  Endemism is highest in Cuba and Hispaniola, the largest members of the Greater Antilles.

List of species

Native species

Acanthaceae
 Avicennia germinans

Anacardiaceae
 Comocladia dodonaea
 Spondias mombin

Annonaceae
 Annona trinitensis 
 Duguetia
 Duguetia lucida
Duguetia tobagensis
 Rollinia
 Rollinia mucosa
 Rollinia exsucca

Apocynaceae
 Plumeria rubra

Arecaceae

Araliaceae
 Aralia
 Aralia excelsa
 Aralia rex
 Dendropanax
 Dendropanax arboreus
 Dendropanax blakeanus
 Dendropanax cordifolius
 Dendropanax cuneifolius
 Dendropanax elongatus
 Dendropanax filipes
 Dendropanax grandiflorus
 Dendropanax grandis
 Dendropanax laurifolius
 Dendropanax nervosus
 Dendropanax nutans
 Dendropanax oblanceatus
 Dendropanax pendulus
 Dendropanax portlandianus
 Dendropanax selleanus
 Dendropanax swartzii
 Oreopanax
 Oreopanax capitatus
 Oreopanax dussii
 Oreopanax ramosissimus
 Schefflera
 Schefflera attenuata
 Schefflera glabrata
 Schefflera gleasonii
 Schefflera morototoni
 Schefflera sciodaphyllum
 Schefflera stearnii
 Schefflera tremula
 Schefflera troyana
 Schefflera urbaniana

Bignoniaceae
 Catalpa longissima
 Crescentia
 Crescentia cujete (Calabash)
 Crescentia portoricensis
 Tabebuia
 Tabebuia heterophylla
 Tabebuia rosea
 Tecoma stans

Bombacaceae
 Ceiba pentandra (Kapok)
 Ochroma pyramidale

Boraginaceae
 Bourreria succulenta
 Cordia
 Cordia alliodora
 Cordia sulcata
 Rochefortia acanthophora

Burseraceae

 Dacryodes excelsa (Tabonuco)
 Bursera simaruba

Buxaceae
 Buxus
 Buxus aneura 
 Buxus brevipes 
 Buxus crassifolia 
 Buxus ekmanii 
 Buxus excisa 
 Buxus heterophylla 
 Buxus imbricata 
 Buxus muelleriana 
 Buxus olivacea 
 Buxus pilosula 
 Buxus portoricensis 
 Buxus rheedioides 
 Buxus vahlii

Canellaceae
 Canella winteriana

Cannabaceae
 Celtis trinervia

Capparidaceae
 Capparis
 Capparis baducca
 Capparis cynophallophora
 Capparis flexuosa
 Capparis hastata
 Capparis indica

Celastraceae
 Cassine xylocarpa
 Gyminda latifolia
 Maytenus
 Maytenus monticola
 Maytenus reflex
 Schaefferia frutescens

Clusiaceae
 Calophyllum
 Calophyllum calaba
 Calophyllum lucidum
 Clusia
 Clusia aripoensis
 Clusia intertexta
 Clusia minor
 Clusia rosea
 Clusia tocuchensis
 Mammea americana

Combretaceae

 Buchenavia tetraphylla
 Bucida buceras
 Conocarpus erectus (Buttonwood)
 Laguncularia racemosa
 Terminalia amazonia

Cupressaceae
 Juniperus barbadensis
 Juniperus gracilior
 Juniperus saxicola

Cyrillaceae

 Cyrilla racemiflora

Dilleniaceae
 Curatella americana

Elaeocarpaceae
 Muntingia calabura
 Sloanea berteroana
 Sloanea caribaea

Erythroxylaceae
 Erythroxylum
 Erythroxylum areolatum
 Erythroxylum brevipes
 Erythroxylum rotundifolium
 Erythroxylum urbanii

Euphorbiaceae
 Adelia rincinella
 Alchornea latifolia
 Bernardia dichotoma
 Fluggea acidoton
 Gymnanthes lucida
 Hura crepitans
 Jatropha hernandiifolia
 Picrodendron baccatum
 Savia sessiliflora

Fabaceae

 Andira inermis
 Caesalpinia coriaria
 Enterolobium cyclocarpum
 Hymenaea courbaril
 Inga
 Inga fagifolia
 Inga vera
 Mora excelsa
 Ormosia krugii
 Pictetia aculeata
 Piscidia carthagenensis
 Pithecellobium unguis-cati
 Pterocarpus officinalis

Flacourtiaceae
 Samyda dodecandra
 Xylosoma buxifolia

Garryaceae
 Garrya fadyenii

Hernandiaceae
 Hernandia sonora

Juglandaceae
 Juglans jamaicensis

Lecythidaceae
 Eschweilera subglandulosa

Malpighiaceae
 Byrsonima
 Byrsonima crassifolia
 Byrsonima spicata

Malvaceae
 Talipariti elatum (Blue Mahoe)
 Thespesia grandiflora
 Hildegardia cubensis

Magnoliaceae
 Magnolia
 Magnolia cristalensis 
 Magnolia cubensis 
 Magnolia dealbata 
 Magnolia domingensis 
 Magnolia ekmanii 
 Magnolia emarginata 
 Magnolia hamorii 
 Magnolia minor 
 Magnolia pallescens 
 Magnolia portoricensis 
 Magnolia splendens

Meliaceae

 Carapa
 Carapa guianensis
 Cedrela odorata
 Guarea
 Guarea guidonia
 Swietenia mahagoni (West Indian Mahogany)
 Trichilia
 Trichilia hirta
 Trichilia triacantha

Moraceae
 Cecropia
 Cecropia peltata
 Cecropia schreberiana
 Ficus
 Ficus americana
 Ficus aurea
 Ficus citrifolia
 Ficus maxima
 Maclura tinctoria

Myrtaceae
 Eugenia
 Eugenia axillaris
 Eugenia biflora
 Eugenia cruegeri
 Eugenia foetida
 Eugenia lingustrina
 Eugenia monticola
 Eugenia procera
 Eugenia rhombea
 Eugenia woodburyana
 Eugenia xerophytica
 Myrciaria floribunda
 Psidium
 Psidium amplexicaule
 Psidium guajava (Guava)

Nyctaginaceae
 Guapira fragrans
 Neea buxifolia
 Pisonia
 Pisonia aculeata
 Pisonia albida
 Pisonia subcordata

Oleaceae
 Forestiera segregata
 Ximenia americana

Pinaceae

 Pinus
 Pinus caribaea
 Pinus cubensis
 Pinus occidentalis
 Pinus tropicalis

Podocarpaceae
 Podocarpus
 Podocarpus angustifolius
 Podocarpus aristulatus
 Podocarpus coriaceus
 Podocarpus hispaniolensis
 Podocarpus purdieanus
 Podocarpus trinitensis
 Podocarpus urbanii

Polygonaceae

 Coccoloba
 Coccoloba diversifolia
 Coccoloba krugii
 Coccoloba microstachya
 Coccoloba swartzii
 Coccoloba uvifera (Sea grape)

Rhamnaceae
 Colubrina
 Colubrina arborescens
 Colubrina elliptica
 Reynosia
 Reynosia guama
 Reynosia uncinata
 Krugiodendron ferreum
 Ziziphus reticulata

Rhizophoraceae

 Rhizophora mangle

Rosaceae
 Prunus occidentalis

Rubiaceae
 Antirhea
 Antirhea acutata
 Antirhea lucida
 Erithalis fruticosa
 Exostema caribaeum
 Genipa americana
 Guettarda
 Guettarda elliptica
 Guettarda krugii
 Guettarda odorata
 Randia
 Randia aculeata
 Randia portoricensis
 Rondelita inermis

Rutaceae

 Amyris
 Amyris balsamifera
 Amyris elemifera
 Zanthoxylum
 Zanthoxylum flavum
 Zanthoxylum martinicense
 Zanthoxylum monophyllum
 Zanthoxylum spinifex
 Zanthoxylum thomasianum

Sapindaceae
 Cupania americana
 Melicoccus bijugatus
 Thouinia striata

Sapotaceae
 Chrysophyllum
 Chrysophyllum argenteum
 Chrysophyllum cainito
 Chrysophyllum oliviforme
 Chrysophyllum pauciflorum
 Manilkara
 Manilkara bidentata
 Manilkara excisa
 Manilkara gonavensis
 Manilkara jaimiqui
 Manilkara mayarensis
 Manilkara pleeana
 Manilkara sideroxylon
 Manilkara valenzuelana
 Micropholis
 Micropholis chrysophylloides
 Pouteria
 Pouteria multiflora
 Pouteria sapota–Mamey sapote
 Pradosia
 Sideroxylon
 Sideroxylon obovatum
 Sideroxylon salicifolium

Sterculiaceae
 Guazuma ulmifolia

Theophrastaceae
 Jacquinia
 Jacquinia armillaris
 Jacquinia berteroi
 Jacquinia umbellata

Verbenaceae
 Citharexylum fruticosa
 Petitia domingensis

Zamiaceae
 Zamia
 Zamia amblyphyllidia
 Zamia portoricensis
 Zamia pumila (Coontie)

Zygophyllaceae
 Guaiacum
 Guaiacum officinale (Lignum vitae)
 Guaiacum sanctum

Non-native species

Anacardiaceae

 Mango (Mangifera indica)

Arecaceae
 Coconut (Cocos nucifera)

Bignoniaceae
 Jacaranda (Jacaranda spp.)

Casuarinaceae
 Casuarina equisetifolia

Combretaceae
 Indian almond (Terminalia catappa)

Fabaceae

 Samaan tree (Albizia saman)
 Flamboyant (Delonix regia)
 Tamarind (Tamarindus indica)

Moraceae
 Breadfruit (Artocarpus altilis)
 Ficus benjamina

Sapindaceae
 Ackee (Blighia sapida)

Sapotaceae
 Manilkara zapota

Verbenaceae

 Teak (Tectona grandis)

References

Caribbean
Caribbean